Guan Jianhua (born 1962) is a female Chinese former international table tennis player.

Table tennis career
She won three World Championship medals. 
She won a bronze medal at the 1985 World Table Tennis Championships in the women's doubles with Tong Ling and two more bronze medals at the 1987 World Table Tennis Championships in the mixed doubles  with Wang Hao and the women's singles.

See also
 List of table tennis players
 List of World Table Tennis Championships medalists

References

Chinese female table tennis players
Living people
1962 births
People from Yangquan
Table tennis players from Shanxi
World Table Tennis Championships medalists